Surbaq (also Romanized as Sūrbāq; also known as Sorbakh, Surban, Sūreh Barq, and Sūr Yātāq) is a village in Garmeh-ye Shomali Rural District, Kandovan District, Meyaneh County, East Azerbaijan Province, Iran. At the 2006 census, its population was 231, in 53 families.

References 

Populated places in Meyaneh County